Pietro Cimara (10 November 1887 – 1 October 1967) was an Italian composer, conductor and pianist.

Biography
He was born on 10 November 1887 in Rome .

He was a student of Respighi at the Accademia di Santa Cecilia in Rome. His output included many songs. He was published by Francesco Bongiovanni of Bologna.

He came a United States citizen on January 22, 1946.

From 1950 to 1957 he was conductor at the Metropolitan Opera, where he had a stroke on January 13, 1958, while conducting La Forza del Destino. After which he retired to Italy.

He died on 1 October 1967 in Milan.

References

Italian male conductors (music)
Italian composers
Italian male composers
Musicians from Rome
1887 births
1967 deaths
20th-century Italian conductors (music)
20th-century Italian male musicians